Baubau is a city in Southeast Sulawesi province, Indonesia. The city is located on the southwest coast of Buton island. Baubau attained city status on 21 June 2001, based on Indonesian Law Number 13, for the year 2001. It covers an area of 294.98 km2, including about 30 km2 of water area, and had a population of 136,991 at the 2010 Census and 159,248 at the 2020 Census; the official estimate as at mid 2021 was 161,354.

The port of Murhum serves the city's sea transportation, with a ferry terminal operated by the Indonesian state-owned sealiner, Pelni.

History 
During the fifteenth century (1401–1499), Baubau was the center of the Buton (or Wolio) kingdom. There were no historical records known from this kingdom, except from a description in the Nagarakretagama text, an Old Javanese eulogy written by Mpu Prapanca during the Majapahit Kingdom. Mpu Prapanca described a village called Buton, or Butuni, with its garden and irrigation system, and noted that there was a king who ruled in the area.

The kingdom of Buton was originally established by Mia Patamiana, a musketeer from a group of four, acting as a chieftain; the four musketeers were known as Sipanjonga, Simalui, Sitamanajo, and Sijawangkati, based on a historical record Semenanjung Tanah Melayu (or the Malay peninsula record) written in the thirteenth century. They arrived on the island and founded the village of Wolio, appointing small district leaders known as Limbo. Later, they united into the Kingdom of Buton and appointed Wa Kaa Kaa as the first queen in 1332; she was the wife of one of the descendants of a Majapahit ruler.

In 1542, the Kingdom of Buton transformed itself into sultanate when Islam entered the area. The first sultan of Buton was Lakilaponto, titled as Sultan Murhum Kaimuddin Khalifatul Khamis. The last sultan, the 38th, was Muhammad Falihi Kaimuddin in 1960.

Geography 
Geographically, Baubau lies between lattitute 5.21°S–5.33°S and longitude 122.30°E–122.47°E, and is located in the southern part of Southeast Sulawesi region. Baubau is bordered to the north by the Buton Strait (between Buton Island and Muna Island), to the east by the Kapontori District, to the south by the Pasarwajo District and to the west by the Kadatua District.

The topographical condition of Baubau mainly consists of mountains and hills. Long coasts and long hills stretch above the surrounding terrain with the variation of altitude between 0–100 meters above mean sea level. Baubau has a land slope between 8–30%.

Similar to other Indonesian cities, Baubau has tropical weather. The day and night temperatures vary from around 29°–33 °C during the daytime and 20°–29 °C during the nighttime. The ecosystems consist of rain forests, spiny forests, and desert.

Administration 
The city is divided into eight districts (kecamatan), tabulated below with their areas and their populations at the 2010 Census and the 2020 Census, together with the official estimates as at mid 2021. The table also includes the locations of the district administrative centres, the numbers of administrative villages (urban kelurahan) in each district, and its post codes.

Notes: (a) including offshore islet of Pulau Makassar. (b) including offshore islets of Pulau Batukapal and Pulau Batusori.

The city was previously divided into just 4 districts; Betoambari (then including Murhum) had an area of 34.34 km2; Wolio (then including Kokalukuna) had an area of 26.77 km2; Sorawolio had an area of 82.25 km2; and Bungi (then including Lea-Lea) had an area of 76.64 km2. The most recent addition is Batupoaro, cut out of Murhum.

Demographics 
The population of the city was 136,991 as of the decennial census 2010 which at the 2020 Census has risen to 159,248, consisting mainly of the Butonese, Buginese, Moluccans, Javanese, and Sundanese people.  It is the second largest city in the province after the capital, Kendari.  The city's economy is mainly in the service industry, such as the hotel industry (30%) and trade (20%), principally sea trade, agriculture (20%), and coconut production, while the remainder is in the public transportation business. Baubau is also a major fishing center in Sulawesi for producing sea cucumber.

Transportation 
Port Murhum serves the city, and is also the island's main access for transportation. Direct sea connections include Jakarta and Kendari. The following passenger ships of the Indonesian state-owned sealiner company PT Pelni serve Baubau: KM Bukit Siguntang, KM Ciremai, KM Dorolonda, KM Kelimutu, KM Sinabung, and KM Lambelu.

The city is served by Betoambari Airport, where connections are available to Sultan Hasanuddin International Airport near Makassar, South Sulawesi.

See also 

Buton Palace Museum

References

External links 

 

Populated places in Sulawesi
Cities in Indonesia
1541 establishments in Asia